Westkapelle is a town in Knokke-Heist, a part of Belgium. In 2013, a fire destroyed the old .

External links
 Westkapelle @ City Review
 Kerktoren stort in bij zware brand in Westkapelle 

Populated places in West Flanders
Knokke-Heist